Richard J. Davidson (born December 12, 1951) is professor of psychology and psychiatry at the University of Wisconsin–Madison as well as founder and chair of the Center for Healthy Minds and the affiliated non-profit Healthy Minds Innovations.

Early life and education

Born to a Jewish family in Brooklyn, Richard "Richie" Davidson attended Midwood High School. While there, between 1968–1971, he worked as a summer research assistant in the sleep laboratory at nearby Maimonides Medical Center cleaning electrodes that had been affixed to subjects' bodies for sleep studies.

Davidson went on to receive his B.A. in Psychology from NYU (Heights) in 1972. He chose to study at Harvard University to work with Daniel Goleman and Gary Schwartz and gained his Ph.D. in Personality, Psychopathology, and Psychophysiology there in 1976. At Harvard, Davidson was mentored by David C. McClelland and was also influenced by Norman Geschwind and Walle J. H. Nauta.

Career

In 1976 Davidson took a teaching post at the State University of New York at Purchase where he subsequently held several posts including research consultancies at the Department of Pediatrics, Infant Laboratory, Roosevelt Hospital, New York and the Laboratory of Neurosciences, National Institute on Aging, NIH.

In 1984 he joined the faculty of the University of Wisconsin at Madison where he has since remained. He previously served as the director of the Laboratory for Affective Neuroscience and of the Waisman Laboratory for Brain Imaging and Behavior. He is founder and director of the Center for Healthy Minds.

Research

Davidson's research is broadly focused on the neural bases of emotion and emotional style as well as methods to promote human flourishing, including meditation and related contemplative practices. His studies have centered on people across the lifespan, from birth through old age. In addition, he has conducted studies with individuals with emotional disorders such as mood and anxiety disorders and autism, as well as expert meditation practitioners with tens of thousands of hours of experience. His research uses a wide range of methods including different varieties of MRI, positron emission tomography, electroencephalography and modern genetic and epigenetic methods.

Richard Davidson is popularizing the idea that based on what is known about the plasticity of the brain, neuroplasticity, that one can learn happiness and compassion as skills just as one learns to play a musical instrument, or train in golf or tennis.  Happiness, like any skill, requires practice and time but because one knows that the brain is built to change in response to mental training, it is possible to train a mind to be happy.

Davidson argues for a diagnosis of clinical depression with the help of emotional style. He describes emotional style as a set of continuums where some people fall at one extreme of the continuum while others fall somewhere in the middle. Clinical depression manifests as extremes on the outlook and resilience dimensions, where those afflicted have a more negative outlook and are slower to recover from adversity.

Richard Davidson and his collaborators have used rhesus monkeys as models of human neurophysiology and emotional response since 1992 when he and fellow UW–Madison researchers Ned H. Kalin and Steven E. Shelton published “Lateralized effects of diazepam on frontal brain electrical asymmetries in rhesus monkeys.”
In 2004 the same group published further results on the role of the central nucleus of the amygdala in mediating fear and anxiety in the primate. In 2007, Drs Kalin, Shelton & Davidson reported that experimental lesions of adolescent rhesus monkeys' orbitofrontal cortex resulted in "significantly decreased threat-induced freezing and marginally decreased fearful responses to a snake."

Dr. Davidson's work with human subjects has attracted the attention of both scientific and popular press, and has been covered by Scientific American and The New York Times.

Use of Primates 
Davidson's has been involved in research that use rhesus macaques to study anxiety, which has led to some controversy and criticism. Davidson has stated that he supports animal research and that it has "undeniably made major contributions to the reduction of suffering" in humans.

Research with the Dalai Lama

Davidson has been a longtime friend of the 14th Dalai Lama, and some of his work involves research on the brain as it relates to meditation. Davidson has long maintained his own daily meditation practice, and continues to communicate regularly with the Dalai Lama.

This connection has caused controversy, with some scientists criticizing Davidson for being too close to someone with an interest in the outcome of his research and others claiming that it represents an inappropriate mix of faith and science. When he invited the Dalai Lama to participate in the "Neuroscience and Society" program of the Society for Neuroscience meeting in 2005, over 500 researchers signed a petition in protest.  Some of the petitioners were Chinese researchers, who may disagree politically with the Dalai Lama's stance on Tibet. The controversy subsided quickly after most scientists attending the talk found it appropriate.

Awards and honors

In 2000, Davidson received the Distinguished Scientific Contribution Award, for lifetime achievement from the American Psychological Association.

Time magazine named Dr. Davidson one of the world's top 100 most influential people in a 2006 issue.

Personal meditation practice

Davidson's practice has changed considerably over the years. In recent years he practices in the Tibetan Buddhist tradition, including prostration to the teachings, and meditating "not primarily for my benefit, but for the benefit of others."

Publications

Davidson has published many papers, chapter articles and edited 13 books. In 2001 he was the founding co-editor, with Klaus Scherer, of the American Psychological Association journal Emotion.

Davidson is currently on the Editorial Board of Greater Good Magazine, published by the Greater Good Science Center of the University of California, Berkeley. Dr. Davidson's contributions include the interpretation of scientific research into the roots of compassion, altruism, and peaceful human relationships.

His most recent book, Altered Traits: Science Reveals How Meditation Changes Your Mind, Brain, and Body, was co-authored with friend and colleague Daniel Goleman and released in September 2017.

He has written a New York Times bestseller (with Sharon Begley) titled The Emotional Life of Your Brain, published by Penguin in March 2012.

A documentary film about the work of Davidson called "Free The Mind", directed by Phie Ambo, was released in 2012.

Selected publications

Papers

Books

References

External links
 University of Wisconsin–Madison:
 Laboratory for Affective Neuroscience
 Waisman Laboratory for Brain Imaging & Behavior
 Center for Investigating Healthy Minds
 Faculty Information Page
 Video of Dr. Davidson's lecture "Implications of Scientific Research on Meditation for Spiritual Care" at the University of Wisconsin–Madison. 2007
 Video of Dr. Davidson's lecture "Cultivating compassion: Neuroscientific and behavioral approaches"
Free The Mind, documentary film profiling Dr. Davidson's work
 Center for Healthy Minds

1951 births
Living people
21st-century American psychologists
American neuroscientists
20th-century American psychologists
Jewish American scientists
Harvard Graduate School of Arts and Sciences alumni
Midwood High School alumni
New York University alumni
People from Brooklyn
University of Wisconsin–Madison faculty
Students of S. N. Goenka
21st-century American Jews
Members of the National Academy of Medicine